Bullous impetigo is a bacterial skin infection caused by Staphylococcus aureus that results in the formation of large blisters called bullae, usually in areas with skin folds like the armpit, groin, between the fingers or toes, beneath the breast, and between the buttocks. It accounts for 30% of cases of impetigo, the other 70% being non-bullous impetigo.

The bullae are caused by exfoliative toxins produced by Staphylococcus aureus that cause the connections between cells in the uppermost layer of the skin to fall apart. Bullous impetigo in newborns, children, or adults who are immunocompromised and/or are experiencing kidney failure, can develop into a more severe and generalized form called staphylococcal scalded skin syndrome (SSSS). The mortality rate is less than 3% for infected children, but up to 60% in adults.

Signs and symptoms

Bullous impetigo can appear around the diaper region, axilla, or neck. The bacteria causes a toxin to be produced that reduces cell-to-cell stickiness (adhesion), causing for the top layer of skin (epidermis), and lower layer of skin (dermis) to separate. Vesicles rapidly enlarge and form the bullae which is a blister more than 5mm across. Bullae is also known as staphylococcal scalded skin syndrome. Other associated symptoms are itching, swelling of nearby glands, fever and diarrhea. Pain is very rare.

Long-term effects: once the scabs on the bullous have fallen off, scarring is minimal.  Possible long-term  effects are kidney disease.

Cause
Exposure is most commonly seen in hospital wards and nurseries, and can be passed from person to person in other settings, such as close contact sports. Therefore, the patient is advised to try to limit human contact as much as possible to minimize the risk of spreading the infection.

Infectious period
After 48 hours the disease is considered no longer contagious assuming the proper antibiotic treatments have been administered.

Pathogenesis
Exfoliating toxins are serine proteases that specifically bind to and cleave desmoglein 1 (Dsg1). Previous studies suggested that exfoliating toxins bind to gangliosides, causing a release of protease by keratinocytes acting as superantigens in stimulating the skin's immune system. A more recent proposal states there are three known exfoliating toxins; ETA, ETB, and ETD which act as a glutamic acid-specific serine protease with concentrated specificity. Which results in the cleavage of human Dsg1 at a unique site after glutamic acid residues causing deactivation. Proteolysis of the peptide bond leading up to the dysfunction of Dsg1 and the desmosome allows for an understanding as to why the bullous forms, making the peptide bond crucial for proper function if Dsg1.

S. aureus
A pyogenic non-motile Gram-positive cocci which forms into grape like clusters. Just like other forms of staph, S. aureus has a variety of virulence factors which include surface proteins involved in adherence, secretion of enzymes that degrade proteins, and secrete toxins which damage the host's cells.

S. aureus expresses surface receptors for fibrinogen, fibronectin, and vitronectin. These surface receptors allow a bridge to be formed which binds to host endothelial cells. Lipases allow for the degradation of lipids on the skin surface and its expression can be directly correlated with its ability of the bacteria to produce abscesses.

Diagnosis
Observing the skin's physical appearance, or swabbing a culture of the lesion for S. aureus. Nasal swabs from the patient's immediate family members are necessary to identify them as being asymptomatic nasal carriers of S. aureus.

Histology
The epidermis is composed of four layers, stratum basale, stratum spinosum, stratum granulosum, and stratum corneum.

The cleavage plane can be found either subcorneally or within the upper stratum granulosum. The roof of the pustule is parakeratotic stratum corneum, and the floor is formed of keratinocytes, which may or may not be acantholytic. Neutrophils begin to fill the pustule. Toxins are produced by S. aureus and target desmoglein, which is a desmosomal cell-cell adhesion molecule found in the upper levels of the epidermis. This correlates with the subcorneal localization of the bullae.

Uncommon variants
 Erythema multiforme
 Systemic lupus erythematosus
 Stevens–Johnson syndrome
 Pemphigus vulgaris

Differential
 HPV
 Insect bites
 Burns
 Herpes simplex 1/2

Prevention
Since the common pathogens involved with impetigo are bacteria naturally found on the skin, most prevention (especially in children), is targeted towards appropriate hygiene, wound cleaning, and minimizing scratching (i.e. by keeping nails trimmed and short). Avoiding close contact and sharing of items such as towels with potentially infected individuals is also recommended.

Management
Antibiotic creams are the preferred treatment for mild cases of impetigo, despite their limited systemic absorption. Such prescribed ointments include neosporin, fusidic acid, chloramphenicol and mupirocin. More severe cases of impetigo however (especially bullous impetigo) will likely require oral agents with better systemic bioavailability, such as cephalexin. Cases that do not resolve with initial antibiotic therapy or require hospitalization may also be indicative an MRSA infection, which would require consultation with a local microbiologist.

Antibiotic treatment typically last 7–10 days, and although highly effective some cases of methicillin resistant S. aureus (MRSA) may require longer therapy depending on the severity of infection and how much it has spread.

See also 
 Impetigo contagiosa
 Skin lesion
 List of conditions caused by problems with junctional proteins

References

External links 

Bacterium-related cutaneous conditions